Petersburg City Public Schools is the public school system in the independent city of Petersburg, Virginia. The district is led by Dr. Julius Hamlin.

Schools

Elementary Schools 
 Cool Springs Elementary School (formerly A. P. Hill Elementary School)
 Lakemont Elementary School (formerly Robert E. Lee Elementary School)
 Pleasants Lane Elementary School (formerly J. E. B. Stuart Elementary School)
 Walnut Hill Elementary School

Middle Schools 
 Vernon Johns Middle School

High Schools 
 Petersburg High School

Other facilities 
 Blandford Learning Academy (Alternative)
 Westview Early Childhood Education Center (Pre-K and Headstart)

References

External links
 http://www.petersburg.k12.va.us

School divisions in Virginia
Education in Petersburg, Virginia